The 1996 Chico State Wildcats football team represented California State University, Chico as a member of the Northern California Athletic Conference (NCAC) during the 1996 NCAA Division II football season. Led by Rob Tomlinson in his first and only season as head coach, Chico State compiled an overall record of 5–5 with a mark of 3–1 in conference play, winning the NCAC title. The team was outscored by its opponents 187 to 181 for the season. The Wildcats played home games at University Stadium in Chico, California.

1996 was the last year Chico State played intercollegiate football. On February 5, 1997, the school announced it was dropping the football program citing the cost of the program and lack of fan support.

Schedule

References

Chico State
Chico State Wildcats football seasons
Northern California Athletic Conference football champion seasons
Chico State Wildcats football